American Share Insurance (ASI) is a private corporation which insures shares (deposits) in some state chartered credit unions in the United States. ASI was established in 1974 as the Ohio Credit Union Shareholders Guaranty Association, changing its name several times until it adopted the name American Share Insurance in 1991. It is the largest privately owned insurance corporation for credit unions.

ASI is headquartered in Dublin, Ohio.

Coverage
Credit unions carrying ASI's private insurance must state that funds deposited in the credit union are insured by a private organization, and that no government or government entity guarantees accounts in that particular credit union.

ASI also offers Excess Share Insurance to subscribing state and Federal credit unions which protects member share accounts from $250,000 to $500,000.  This product is used by credit unions which have National Credit Union Share Insurance Fund (NCUSIF) insurance on the base $250,000 guaranteed by that fund.

Management 

 Dennis R. Adams - President & CEO
 Pete Love - VP of Finance & Secretary/Treasurer
 Kurt Kluth - VP of Information Technology
 Kurt Loose - VP of Examination and Insurance
 David Kettlehake - VP of Sales & Marketing

Source:

References

American companies established in 1974
Financial services companies established in 1974
Insurance companies of the United States
Credit unions of the United States
Companies based in Dublin, Ohio
Deposit insurance in the United States
1974 establishments in Ohio

External links